The 1949 Nobel Prize in Literature was awarded the American author William Faulkner (1897–1962) "for his powerful and artistically unique contribution to the modern American novel." The prize was awarded the following year on October 1950. The Nobel Committee for Literature had decided that none of the nominations for 1949 met the criteria as outlined in the will of Alfred Nobel, and the prize was reserved until the following year.

Laureate

William Faulkner generally is regarded as one of the most significant American writers of all time. Faulkner wrote 13 novels and many short stories but started as a poet. With his breakthrough novel, The Sound and the Fury (1929), he began to use stream of consciousness to portray a character's flow of inner thoughts. His books often are told from the point of view of several characters and contain accurately rendered colloquialisms combined with long sentences full of imagery and language that is sometimes surreal. Among his other famous works include As I Lay Dying (1930), Light In August (1934) and Absalom! Absalom! (1936).

Deliberations

Nominations
William Faulkner was not nominated for the prize in 1949, but he was nominated the following year and in 1950 the Swedish Academy decided to award Faulkner the Nobel Prize in Literature for 1949. Faulkner was nominated by Prince Wilhelm, Duke of Södermanland who became the president of the Swedish PEN Centre. Faulkner had not been nominated for the prize before, making it a rare occasion when an author have been awarded the Nobel Prize in Literature the same year they were first nominated.

In total, the Nobel committee received 43 nominations for the 1949 prize including Benedetto Croce, Thornton Wilder, Winston Churchill (awarded in 1953), François Mauriac (awarded in 1952), Carl Sandburg, Georges Duhamel, and Pär Lagerkvist (awarded in 1951). 9 of the nominees were nominated first-time among them Albert Camus (awarded in 1957), Leonid Leonov, Enrique González Martínez, Alfonso Reyes, Taha Hussein, and Alberto Moravia. Three of the nominees were women: Marie Under, Henriette Charasson, and Dorothy Canfield Fisher. 

The authors James Truslow Adams, Hervey Allen, Chairil Anwar, Rex Beach, Elsa Bernstein, Maurice Blondel, Jacques Copeau, Will Cuppy, Lucien Descaves, Ali Douagi, William Price Drury, Inés Echeverría Bello, Herbert Eulenberg, Yaroslav Halan, Edmond Jaloux, Klaus Mann, Sarojini Naidu, Elin Pelin, Gustav Radbruch, Alexander Serafimovich, George Shiels, Booth Tarkington, Elin Wägner, and Oton Župančič died in 1949 without having been nominated for the prize.

Prize decision
On 3 November 1949 the Swedish Academy announced that no Nobel Prize in Literature would be awarded that year:
"No Nobel Prize in Literature will be awarded this year. And the justification, in short, is that none of this year's candidates has been able to gather the absolute majority required according to the statutes for the prize to be awarded. For the time being, two literature prizes are therefore at the Academy's disposal next year. In 1918 and 1935 the same measure was taken on the same grounds.”

The Academy awarded the prize for 1949 the following year to William Faulkner, while Bertrand Russell was awarded the 1950 Nobel Prize in Literature.

Award ceremony speech
In his award ceremony speech on 10 December 1950, Gustaf Hellström, member of the Swedish Academy, said of Faulkner: "As a probing psychologist he is the unrivalled master among all living British and American novelists. Neither do any of his colleagues possess his fantastic imaginative powers and his ability to create characters. His subhuman and superhuman figures, tragic or comic in a macabre way, emerge from his mind with a reality that few existing people – even those nearest to us – can give us", "Moreover – side by side with Joyce and perhaps even more so – Faulkner is the great experimentalist among twentieth-century novelists. Scarcely two of his novels are similar technically. It seems as if by this continuous renewal he wanted to achieve the increased breadth which his limited world, both in geography and in subject matter, cannot give him. The same desire to experiment is shown in his mastery, unrivalled among modern British and American novelists, of the richness of the English language, a richness derived from its different linguistic elements and the periodic changes in style – from the spirit of the Elizabethans down to the scanty but expressive vocabulary of the Negroes of the southern states."

Acceptance speech
At the banquet, Faulkner read his acceptance speech, which he ended with an affirmation of faith: 

The speech was later made available in print.

Reactions
The choice of William Faulkner as the Nobel Prize Laureate was well received. Faulkner himself at first refused to travel to Sweden to accept the award, but was persuaded by friends and his wife to travel. At the banquet in Stockholm on 10 December 1950 he held a memorable acceptance speech. Faulkner eventually gave away the prize money in scholarships and other bequests.

Notes

References

External links
Award Ceremony speech nobelprize.org
Faulkner's Banquet speech nobelprize.org
The Nobel Prize Award Ceremony 1950 video nobelprize.org

1949
William Faulkner